The 2001 Fayetteville mayoral election took place on November 6, 2001 to elect the mayor of Fayetteville, North Carolina. It saw the election of mayor Marshall Pitts Jr., who unseated incumbent mayor Milo McBryde, who had taken office following the death of 

Pitts became the city's first African American mayor.

Results

Primary
The primary was held October 9, 2001.

General election

References

2001
2001 North Carolina elections
2001 United States mayoral elections